"Call Me Joe" is a science fiction novelette  by American writer Poul Anderson, published in Astounding Science Fiction in April 1957.  It later appeared in Anderson's 1981 collection The Dark Between the Stars. The Science Fiction Writers of America selected "Call Me Joe" for The Science Fiction Hall of Fame, Volume Two.

The plot involves an attempt to explore the surface of the planet Jupiter using remote-controlled artificial life-forms. It focuses on the feelings of a disabled man who operates an artificial body.

Plot 
Joe is awakened in his den, when a pack of predators are attacking him.  Using his great strength, and weapons made from sculpted ice, he kills the animals and, exultant, bays at the moon above him.  A vital component shorts out, and "Joe" reverts to being a human, Ed Anglesey, wearing a special headset on a space station orbiting Jupiter.  Anglesey furiously repairs the equipment to restore the connection.

It transpires that such equipment failures are happening more and more often.  All technical attempts at repair have failed, and instead a psionics expert, Cornelius, is brought to the station to determine if Anglesey himself is the problem.

Anglesey uses a wheelchair. He is bad-tempered, dislikes all his colleagues, and is disliked in return.  He is allowed to stay on the station only because of his ability to establish a telepathic connection with and thereby control Joe, a creature designed to survive the hostile conditions on the Jovian surface.  Cornelius conjectures that something in Anglesey's mind rejects or fears Jupiter, and the resulting feedback keeps destroying the delicate equipment.

Eventually Cornelius is allowed to share a session with Anglesey during an important part of the mission.  A set of autonomous female Jovians, similar to Joe but lacking a human controller such as Anglesey, has been launched from the satellite and will soon land on Jupiter.  Joe, still controlled by Anglesey, is to be the leader, and father, of a new race that will live on the planet.  During this session, Cornelius becomes aware of a third mind – that of Joe himself.  Anglesey's mind has been steadily transforming itself into Joe and shrinking in the process. Cornelius was looking at the problem from the wrong end – it was not Anglesey's fear of going to Jupiter and becoming sublimated into Joe's stronger character which was causing the blowouts, but his fear of leaving Jupiter and the freedom Joe's whole and healthy, though non-human, body allows him.  Anglesey's existence is poor and constricted compared to Joe's, and the environment has shaped a personality that no longer wants to be human.

Seeing himself from Cornelius's perspective, Joe becomes fully self-aware.  He ejects Cornelius from the loop and shuts down what is left of Anglesey.

Cornelius revives on the station next to the hollow shell of Anglesey's body.  Far from being dismayed, Cornelius realizes that this is the way of the future.  From now on people with diseased bodies and even the aged can be recruited for the Jovian program if they have the necessary talents.  Eventually they will leave their bodies behind and become Jovians in the flesh, functioning as the priesthood of the new race.

In popular culture 
A comic book adaptation of Call Me Joe appeared in issue 4 of Starstream, 1976 (script by George Kashdan, art by Adolfo Buylla).

The premise of a paraplegic man whose mind remotely controls an alien body also appears in James Cameron's 2009 film Avatar, similar enough for some critics to have called for Anderson to receive credit.

References

External links
 
  Call Me Joe audio reading at Berfrois

1957 short stories
Brain–computer interfacing in fiction
Fiction set on Jupiter
Science fiction short stories
Novellas by Poul Anderson